The election of Members of Parliament (MPs) to the Parliament of the Second Republic was held on 29 August 1969.

Seats composition

List of MPs elected in the general election
The following table is a list of MPs elected on 29 August 1969, ordered by region and constituency.



See also
1969 Ghanaian parliamentary election
Parliament of Ghana
Nii Amaa Ollennu - Speaker of the Parliament of the 2nd Republic.

Notes and references

1969